Pavieasia anamensis is an Asian tree species in the family Sapindaceae. It is found in Vietnam where it may be called trường nhãn; no subspecies are listed in the Catalogue of Life.

References 

Sapindaceae
Flora of Indo-China
Trees of Vietnam
Plants described in 1894